TCDD DH4100 was a single diesel-hydraulic shunter built for the Turkish State Railways by Jenbacher based on Jenbacher DH400C.

External links
 Trains of Turkey page on DH4100

Turkish State Railways diesel locomotives
B locomotives
Individual locomotives of Turkey
Standard gauge locomotives of Turkey
Railway locomotives introduced in 1960